Meg is a feminine given name, often a short form of Margaret, Megan, Megumi (Japanese), etc. It may refer to:

People
Meg (singer), a Japanese singer
Meg Cabot (born 1967), American author of romantic and paranormal fiction
Meg Burton Cahill (born 1954), American politician and former Arizona state senator
Meg Foster (born 1948), American actress
Meg Greenfield (1930-1999), American Pulitzer Prize-winning editorial writer and columnist
Meg Frampton (born 1985), guitarist and back-up singer for the band Meg & Dia
Meg Hutchins (born 1982), Australian rules footballer
Meg Kelly, American television soap opera screenwriter
Meg Lanning (born 1992), Australian cricketer
Meg Lee Chin, Taiwanese-American singer-songwriter, best known as a member of the group Pigface
Meg LeFauve, American screenwriter (co-nominated for the Academy Award for Inside Out) and producer
Meg Lees (born 1948), Australian politician
Meg Mallon (born 1963), American LPGA golfer
Meg Morris (born 1992), American National Women's Soccer League player
Meg Ryan (born 1961), American actress
Meg Tilly, Canadian-American actress, born Margaret Elizabeth Chan in 1960
Meg Turney, American YouTube personality 
Meg White (born 1974), American drummer, half of the rock duo The White Stripes (with former husband Jack White)
Meg Whitman (born 1956), former CEO of eBay and California gubernatorial candidate
Meg Wolitzer (born 1959), American author
Meg Wyllie (1917–2002), American actress
Long Meg of Westminster (16th-century) English tavern keeper
Margarete Pioresan, known as Meg (born 1956), Brazilian football goalkeeper
Meg Donnelly (born 2000), American actress mostly known for her work with Disney Channel
Meg (Maria Di Donna), an Italian singer and former member of band 99 Posse and duo Nous

Fictional characters
The Meg, the titlular megalodon shark in the 2018 action movie The Meg
Meg Griffin, one of the main characters on the animated television show Family Guy
Margaret March, in Louisa May Alcott's novels Little Women, Little Men and Jo's Boys
Meg Masters, on the television show Supernatural
Meg Murry, in Madeleine L'Engle's Time Quintet novels
Meg Snyder, on the American soap opera As the World Turns
Meg!, a comic strip
Megara (Disney) in Disney's 1997 film Hercules
Meg, a minor character in Xena: Warrior Princess
Meg, a supporting character in The Trials of Apollo by Rick Riordan
, a character from the Assassination Classroom manga and anime series
Meg and Mog, a series of children's books written by Helen Nicoll and illustrated by Jan Pieńkowski

Feminine given names
Given names derived from gemstones
Hypocorisms